Józefowo may refer to:

Józefowo, Aleksandrów County in Kuyavian-Pomeranian Voivodeship (north-central Poland)
Józefowo, Toruń County in Kuyavian-Pomeranian Voivodeship (north-central Poland)
Józefowo, Gmina Izbica Kujawska in Kuyavian-Pomeranian Voivodeship (north-central Poland)
Józefowo, Gmina Włocławek in Kuyavian-Pomeranian Voivodeship (north-central Poland)
Józefowo, Gmina Lubraniec in Kuyavian-Pomeranian Voivodeship (north-central Poland)
Józefowo, Mogilno County in Kuyavian-Pomeranian Voivodeship (north-central Poland)
Józefowo, Augustów County in Podlaskie Voivodeship (north-east Poland)
Józefowo, Białystok County in Podlaskie Voivodeship (north-east Poland)
Józefowo, Kolno County in Podlaskie Voivodeship (north-east Poland)
Józefowo, Suwałki County in Podlaskie Voivodeship (north-east Poland)
Józefowo, Gmina Lipowiec Kościelny in Masovian Voivodeship (east-central Poland)
Józefowo, Gmina Radzanów in Masovian Voivodeship (east-central Poland)
Józefowo, Gmina Strzegowo in Masovian Voivodeship (east-central Poland)
Józefowo, Płońsk County in Masovian Voivodeship (east-central Poland)
Józefowo, Przasnysz County in Masovian Voivodeship (east-central Poland)
Józefowo, Sierpc County in Masovian Voivodeship (east-central Poland)
Józefowo, Wyszków County in Masovian Voivodeship (east-central Poland)
Józefowo, Ostrołęka County in Masovian Voivodeship (east-central Poland)
Józefowo, Chodzież County in Greater Poland Voivodeship (west-central Poland)
Józefowo, Gostyń County in Greater Poland Voivodeship (west-central Poland)
Józefowo, Gmina Babiak in Greater Poland Voivodeship (west-central Poland)
Józefowo, Gmina Kleczew in Greater Poland Voivodeship (west-central Poland)
Józefowo, Gmina Rzgów in Greater Poland Voivodeship (west-central Poland)
Józefowo, Gmina Przedecz in Greater Poland Voivodeship (west-central Poland)
Józefowo, Międzychód County in Greater Poland Voivodeship (west-central Poland)
Józefowo, Nowy Tomyśl County in Greater Poland Voivodeship (west-central Poland)
Józefowo, Słupca County in Greater Poland Voivodeship (west-central Poland)
Józefowo, Szamotuły County in Greater Poland Voivodeship (west-central Poland)
Józefowo, Środa Wielkopolska County in Greater Poland Voivodeship (west-central Poland)
Józefowo, Wągrowiec County in Greater Poland Voivodeship (west-central Poland)
Józefowo, Złotów County in Greater Poland Voivodeship (west-central Poland)
Józefowo, Pomeranian Voivodeship (north Poland)
Józefowo, Braniewo County in Warmian-Masurian Voivodeship (north Poland)
Józefowo, Elbląg County in Warmian-Masurian Voivodeship (north Poland)
Józefowo, Olsztyn County in Warmian-Masurian Voivodeship (north Poland)